Fabian Gmeiner (born 27 January 1997) is an Austrian professional footballer who plays as a right-back for Austria Lustenau.

Club career
On 5 August 2020, he signed a two-year contract with Austria Lustenau.

Honours
Austria Lustenau
 Austrian Football Second League: 2021–22

References

1997 births
Living people
Association football forwards
Austrian footballers
Austrian expatriate footballers
Austria youth international footballers
Austria under-21 international footballers
NEC Nijmegen players
Hamburger SV II players
Sportfreunde Lotte players
SC Austria Lustenau players
Eredivisie players
Regionalliga players
2. Liga (Austria) players
People from Dornbirn
Austrian expatriate sportspeople in the Netherlands
Austrian expatriate sportspeople in Germany
Expatriate footballers in the Netherlands
Expatriate footballers in Germany
Footballers from Vorarlberg